The first season of the animated series Winx Club aired from 28 January to 26 March 2004, consisting of 26 episodes. The series was created by Iginio Straffi, who also acted as executive producer and director of the season.

The season revolves around Bloom, a 16-year-old girl from Earth who discovers she has magical abilities, as she enrolls in the Alfea College for Fairies. Along with her newfound friend Stella, a 17-year-old fairy, Bloom meets her apartment roommates Flora, Musa and Tecna. Together, they form the Winx Club. During their adventures, they become good friends and get to know some of the boys from another school called Red Fountain, but also encounter some adversaries, including a trio of young witches called the Trix.

In February 2011, Nickelodeon's parent company Viacom became a co-owner of the Rainbow studio. Rainbow and Nickelodeon Animation Studio produced a Winx Club revival series, which began with four television specials that retell the first two seasons of the original show. The first three specials summarized the plot of the first season with new animation.

Production
Comic artist Iginio Straffi conceived the idea for Winx Club in the mid-1990s, when he noticed that action cartoons were usually focused on male heroes. By 2000, he had developed a short pilot episode for the series, then titled Magic Bloom. This animation included many concepts that would eventually appear in the series, such as the five original Winx members and the Trix, but the characters were younger and their outfits were not modelled after fashion trends. The pilot garnered the support of Italy's public broadcasting company, RAI, but Straffi was unsatisfied with the final product. He made the decision to scrap the animation and heavily rework the concept, despite a financial investment of over €100,000 in the completed pilot.

Production on the retooled series was underway by 2002, and Rainbow estimated that the episodes would be delivered to distributors by autumn 2003. At the October 2003 MIPCOM event, Rainbow screened the show's first episode to international companies. Later in the month, the American network Fox announced that it had picked up the show's first season of twenty-six episodes. The first season eventually made its world premiere on Rai Due on 28 January 2004.

Episodes

Home media

References

Winx Club